Manchester is a city in Hillsborough County in southern New Hampshire, United States. It has a population of over 115,000 people. This article is a list of the tallest buildings in Manchester and New Hampshire.

Buildings and structures in Manchester, New Hampshire
Manchester
Tallest in Manchester